Popeye is a monthly fashion and men's magazine based in Tokyo, Japan. It is one of the oldest magazines featuring articles about men's fashion. Its tagline is "Magazine for City Boys". The magazine is considered to be the Japanese version of Nylon magazine.

History and profile
Popeye was started in 1976 as a male version of an an, a women's magazine. It is successor of two publications, Ski Life and Made in U.S.A. 

The first issue of Popeye appeared in July 1976 which featured the dominant fashion trends in Los Angeles. Yoshihisa Kinameri is the launch editor of the magazine. The publisher is Magazine House Ltd., a Tokyo based publishing company. The company, which is also the founder of the magazine, was previously named Heibun Shuppan. The magazine was formerly published on a biweekly basis. It is now published on a monthly basis. It focuses on fashion, and its content mostly is about clothes, bags, shoes and accessories. It targets young educated urban men.

In 2012 Takahiro Kinoshita became the editor-in-chief of the magazine. The same year the magazine was redesigned.

Popeye has several sister publications, including an an, Brutus and Croissant. In 2013 Popeye and Brutus received best magazine award. In July 2016 Popeye celebrated its 40th anniversary.

In 1999 Popeye sold 220,000 copies.

References

External links
 Official website
 

1976 establishments in Japan
Biweekly magazines published in Japan
Fashion magazines published in Japan
Lifestyle magazines published in Japan
Magazines established in 1976
Magazines published in Tokyo
Men's fashion magazines
Men's magazines published in Japan
Monthly magazines published in Japan